The women's 10,000 metres at the 2017 Asian Athletics Championships was held on 9 July.

Results

References
Results

10000
10,000 metres at the Asian Athletics Championships